Alqama ibn Mujazziz al-Mudliji al-Kinani was an early Muslim commander under the Islamic prophet Muhammad and the caliphs Abu Bakr and Umar. He was a leading commander and governor of Jund Filastin (the military district of Palestine) under Abu Bakr, Umar, and possibly for a relatively short period under Uthman.

Life
Alqama's father was a certain Mujazziz or Muharriz of the Mudlij branch of the Kinana tribe. From 630 the Islamic prophet Muhammad appointed him a commander of a number of expeditions, and he continued as a commander after Muhammad's death under Caliph Abu Bakr.

Abu Bakr dispatched Alqama to lead the conquest of Palestine with Amr ibn al-As. In 636 or 637 Caliph Umar appointed Alqama as governor of half of the newly created military district of Jund Filastin headquartered in Jerusalem. Alqama ibn Hakim al-Kinani was appointed over the other half of Palestine. According to one version of the Islamic tradition Alqama was charged with confronting Byzantine troops concentrated in Gaza.

According one version in the Islamic tradition Muhammad had appointed Alqama to command a naval operation against the Abyssinian Empire in 630 or 631, and the mission was successful. In another version, Alqama was appointed to lead the same operation by Umar in 641, in the course of which Alqama was slain. According to a report of the 8th-century historian Sayf ibn Umar, Alqama had been governor of Palestine at the time of Umar's death in 644, while he also held that during the first two years of Uthman's reign, i.e. 644–646, Alqama's son Abd al-Rahman had been governor. After Abd al-Rahman's death Jund Filastin was attached to the Syrian governorship of Mu'awiya ibn Abi Sufyan.

References

Bibliography

640s deaths
7th-century Arabs
Generals of the Rashidun Caliphate
Military personnel killed in action
Medieval Palestine
Kinana